24th Brigade may refer to:

Australia
 24th Brigade (Australia)

Greece
 24th Armored Brigade (Greece)

India
 24th Indian Infantry Brigade

Japan
 24th Mixed Brigade (Imperial Japanese Army)

United Kingdom
 24th Armoured Brigade (Dummy Tanks)
 24th Armoured Brigade (United Kingdom)
 24th Infantry Brigade (United Kingdom)
 24th (Gold Coast) Brigade later 2nd (West Africa) Infantry Brigade
 Artillery Brigades
 24th Brigade Royal Field Artillery

See also
 24th Division (disambiguation)
 24 Squadron (disambiguation)